Louisiana Highway 2 Alternate (LA 2 Alt.) is a state highway located in northern Louisiana.  It runs  in an east–west direction from Shongaloo to Bernice, connecting to its parent route at either end.

LA 2 Alt. parallels the route of LA 2 to the north, traveling through the town of Haynesville, where it intersects U.S. Highway 79 (US 79).  It is the only "Alternate" state route in Louisiana.

Route description
From the west, LA 2 Alt. begins at an intersection with LA 2 and LA 159 in Shongaloo. While LA 2 turns to the south co-signed with LA 159, LA 2 Alt. heads due east and crosses from Webster Parish into Claiborne Parish. Just across the parish line, LA 2 Alt. intersects LA 521. Here it intersects LA 534, crosses the Louisiana and North West Railroad (LNW) tracks, and intersects US 79. LA 2 Alt. turns south, approaching the center of town and overlapping US 79 for one block, before resuming an eastward course along Sherman Street. On the east edge of town, LA 2 Alt. intersects LA 807.

After , LA 2 Alt. intersects LA 161 at a point known as Gordon and curves to the southeast.   later, it intersects LA 520, and the two highways engage in a brief concurrency until LA 520 turns north at Colquitt. LA 2 Alt. continues southeast for another  to Summerfield.

LA 2 Alt. proceeds southeast into the town of Bernice, where it intersects and turns south onto the concurrent US 63/US 167.  Approaching the center of town, eastbound (or southbound) traffic proceeds onto Plum Street while westbound (or northbound) traffic follows Cherry Street.  LA 2 Alt. ends six blocks later when it reaches its parent route at 4th Street.

LA 2 Alt. is an undivided two-lane highway for its entire length, except for the brief divided four-lane segment concurrent with US 63/US 167 at its eastern end.

History
In the original Louisiana Highway system in use between 1921 and 1955, the entire route of LA 2 Alt. was part of State Route 70.

LA 2 Alt. is an anomaly in the current system, being the only special state route designated in the 1955 renumbering and the only "Alternate" state route. Its route has seen only one major change, the relocation of its western terminus from Sykes Ferry to Shongaloo in the early 1970s. The only other change resulted from the recent widening of US 63/US 167 to four lanes in Bernice, concurrent with LA 2 Alt. at its eastern end, via the one-way pair of Plum and Cherry Streets.

Major intersections

See also

Notes

References

External links

Maps / GIS Data Homepage, Louisiana Department of Transportation and Development

0002A
Transportation in Webster Parish, Louisiana
Transportation in Claiborne Parish, Louisiana
Transportation in Union Parish, Louisiana